Ben Murphy (born 23 April 2001) is an Irish rugby union player, currently playing for United Rugby Championship and European Rugby Champions Cup side Leinster. His preferred position is scrum-half.

Leinster
The son of Ireland U20 coach Richie Murphy, Murphy was named in the Leinster Rugby academy for the 2021–22 season. He made his debut in Round 18 of the 2021–22 United Rugby Championship against . While a member of the Leinster sub-academy, Murphy joined  on a short-term loan to cover for injuries.

References

External links
itsrugby.co.uk Profile

2001 births
Living people
Rugby union players from County Wicklow
Irish rugby union players
Munster Rugby players
Leinster Rugby players
Rugby union scrum-halves